The scientific community in United States and Europe are primarily concerned with the possible effect of electronic cigarette use on public health. There is concern among public health experts that e-cigarettes could renormalize smoking, weaken measures to control tobacco, and serve as a gateway for smoking among youth. The public health community is divided over whether to support e-cigarettes, because their safety and efficacy for quitting smoking is unclear. Many in the public health community acknowledge the potential for their quitting smoking and decreasing harm benefits, but there remains a concern over their long-term safety and potential for a new era of users to get addicted to nicotine and then tobacco. There is concern among tobacco control academics and advocates that prevalent universal vaping "will bring its own distinct but as yet unknown health risks in the same way tobacco smoking did, as a result of chronic exposure", among other things.

Medical organizations differ in their views about the health implications of vaping and avoid releasing statements about the relative toxicity of electronic cigarettes because of the many different device types, liquid formulations, and new devices that come onto the market. Some healthcare groups and policy makers have hesitated to recommend e-cigarettes with nicotine for quitting smoking, despite some evidence of effectiveness (when compared to Nicotine Replacement Therapy or e-cigarettes without nicotine) and safety. Reasons for hesitancy include challenges ensuring that quality control measures on the devices and liquids are met, unknown second hand vapour inhalation effects, uncertainty about EC use leading to the initiation of smoking or effects on people new to smoking who develop nicotine dependence, unknown long-term effects of electronic cigarette use on human health, uncertainty about the effects of ECs on smoking regulations and smoke free legislation measures, and uncertainty about involvement of the tobacco industry.

Some have advocated bans on e-cigarette sales and others have suggested that e-cigarettes may be regulated as tobacco products but with less nicotine content or be regulated as a medicinal product. A 2016 World Health Organization (WHO) report found that the scientific evidence for the effectiveness of vaping for quitting smoking is "scant and of low certainty". Healthcare organizations in the United Kingdom in 2015 have encouraged smokers to try e-cigarettes to help them quit smoking and also encouraged e-cigarette users to quit smoking tobacco entirely. In 2016, the US Food and Drug Administration (FDA) stated that "Although ENDS [electronic nicotine delivery systems] may potentially provide cessation benefits to individual smokers, no ENDS have been approved as effective cessation aids." In 2019 the European Respiratory Society stated that "The long-term effects of ECIG use are unknown, and there is therefore no evidence that ECIGs are safer than tobacco in the long term." Following hundreds of possible cases of severe lung illness and five confirmed deaths associated with vaping in the US, the Centers for Disease Control and Prevention stated on September 6, 2019 that people should consider not using vaping products while their investigation is ongoing.

International
In August 2016, a report produced by the World Health Organization (WHO) for the Conference of the Parties to the WHO Framework Convention on Tobacco Control, found "there is not enough research to quantify the relative risk of ENDS/ENNDS over combustible products. Therefore, no specific figure about how much 'safer' the use of these products is compared to smoking can be given any scientific credibility at this time." In July 2014, a WHO report found there was not enough evidence to determine if electronic cigarettes can help people quit smoking and made various recommendations as to a suitable regulatory framework for them. Smokers should be encouraged to use approved methods for help with quitting, but the same report also noted that experts indicate that e-cigarettes may have a role in helping some smokers who have failed to quit by other means. The report stated that "Smokers will obtain the maximum health benefit if they completely quit both tobacco and nicotine use."

In August 2014, the Forum of International Respiratory Societies, which represents multiple pulmonary associated medical associations in the United States, Latin America, Africa, Europe, and Asia, released a statement in which they argued that e-cigarettes have not been demonstrated to be safe and their benefits as a smoking cessation tool or in harm reduction has not been adequately studied. They recommended banning their use, or regulation as medicines or tobacco products if not banned, until adequate studies are performed. In May 2018, the Forum of International Respiratory Societies released a position statement, stating "ENDS are devices that deliver aerosols of nicotine and other volatile chemicals to the lung. Their use has rapidly escalated among youths and they are now the most commonly used tobacco product among adolescents. Initiation of electronic cigarette use is strongly associated with the subsequent initiation of combustible tobacco product use among adolescents."

In January 2014, the International Union Against Tuberculosis and Lung Disease released a statement asserting that the benefits and safety of e-cigarettes have not been scientifically proven. The statement highlighted concerns with regards to "re-normalization" of smoking behavior and exposure of third parties to possibly dangerous emissions from e-cigarettes, and strongly supported regulation of electronic cigarettes, preferably as medicines.

The World Lung Foundation (now known as Vital Strategies) applauded the 2014 WHO report's recommendation for tighter regulation of e-cigarettes due to concerns about the safety of e-cigarettes and the possible increased nicotine or tobacco addiction among youth.

In October 2012, the World Medical Association released a statement which stated, "Due to the lack of rigorous chemical and animal studies, as well as clinical trials on commercially available e-cigarettes, neither their value as therapeutic aids for smoking cessation nor their safety as cigarette replacements is established. Lack of product testing does not permit the conclusion that e-cigarettes do not produce any harmful products even if they produce fewer dangerous substances than conventional cigarettes."

Australia
The Therapeutic Goods Administration (TGA) of Australia has stated that "the quality and safety of electronic cigarettes is not known" due to the lack of studies, unlike conventional nicotine replacement therapies, and lists possible risks involved with buying or using electronic cigarettes. They also state, "The Australian Government is concerned about the use of electronic cigarettes in Australia. The impact of wide-scale use of these devices on tobacco use is not known, and the outcome in the community could be harmful."

A 2014 practice guideline by NPS MedicineWise states, "While use of e-cigarettes may be safer than smoking tobacco, so far there is limited evidence to support their effectiveness as aids in smoking cessation. There are also safety issues to consider and the long-term effects are unknown." This guideline recommends physicians steer patients away from e-cigarettes to "more established" methods of smoking cessation until safety and efficacy are established.

The Cancer Council Australia and Heart Foundation released a joint position statement that stated, "The limited evidence available points to a risk that widespread electronic cigarette use could undo the decades of public policy work in Australia that has reduced the appeal of cigarette use in children" and the "short and long term health effects of electronic cigarette use remain unknown." They also consider claims that e-cigarettes can help quit smoking as "unsubstantiated" and urge "extreme caution on electronic cigarettes" while urging significant regulations of both nicotinic and non-nicotinic electronic cigarettes.

Following 7 reported deaths in the US associated with vaping-induced lung illness, the Australian Medical Association stated on September 18, 2019 that they reiterate a precautionary approach for the use of vaping products.

In January 2020 the Royal Australian College of General Practitioners updated their advice on smoking cessation, stating that "for people who have tried to achieve smoking cessation with approved pharmacotherapies but failed, but who are still motivated to quit smoking and have brought up e-cigarette usage with their healthcare practitioner, nicotine-containing e-cigarettes may be a reasonable intervention to recommend."

Canada
Health Canada states in relation to the Tobacco and Vaping Products Act which became law on May 23, 2018 that "vaping is less harmful than smoking. Many of the toxic and cancer-causing chemicals in tobacco and the tobacco smoke form when tobacco is burned." They further state that "vaping products and e-cigarettes deliver nicotine in a less harmful way than smoking, and may reduce health risks for smokers".

The Canadian Cancer Society has concluded, e-cigarettes "have not been scientifically proven to help people quit" smoking tobacco.

The Canadian Heart and Stroke Foundation has stated, "While early studies show some potential benefits, the effectiveness of e-cigarettes with nicotine as a smoking cessation device is not fully conclusive," and expressed concerns about the lack of long term studies with regard to health effects to the user as well as second-hand exposure. They also note public health officials' concerns about renormalizing smoking behavior undermining current tobacco control as well as being a gateway for nicotine addiction and tobacco use disorder.

New Zealand
In 2014, the Ministry of Health of New Zealand has reviewed the evidence around e-cigarettes and has stated, "The long-term health risks associated with vaping products are still unknown but evidence suggests that they are much lower than the risks associated with tobacco smoking. As such it is expected that health risks will reduce significantly for smokers who switch to vaping." and recommends "encourages smokers who want to use vaping products to quit smoking to seek the support of local stop smoking services". In 2016 they stated, "There is a lack of clarity about long-term health risks to users and the potential adverse effects on non-users exposed to e-cigarette vapour."

In 2020, the Ministry of Health of New Zealand issued a new position statement on nicotine vaping: “The Ministry considers vaping products could disrupt inequities and contribute to Smokefree 2025. The evidence on vaping products indicates they carry much less risk than smoking cigarettes but are not risk free.  Evidence is growing that vaping can help people to quit smoking.  There is no international evidence that vaping products are undermining the long-term decline in cigarette smoking among adults and youth, and may in fact be contributing to it.” 

The Cancer Society of New Zealand released a position statement which states, "There is growing evidence that e-cigarettes containing nicotine assist adult smokers to quit smoking tobacco. E-cigarettes pose fewer risks than tobacco and reduce the user’s exposure to numerous toxicants present in tobacco." and that "Adult smokers have access to quality-controlled e-cigarettes/e-liquid and tobacco smoking cessation advice.

Philippines
The Food and Drug Administration of the Philippines released a statement saying that there has been little evidence published about the health effects of electronic cigarettes, including whether they help quit smoking. The statement concluded that the available evidence does not support those who advocate for their use either as tools to help quit smoking or for harm reduction.

The Philippine Medical Association has also taken a strong position against the use of electronic cigarettes, citing safety concerns.

Europe

In 2019 the European Respiratory Society stated that "The long-term effects of ECIG use are unknown, and there is therefore no evidence that ECIGs are safer than tobacco in the long term." However, in 2020 the World Health Organization Regional Office for Europe issued a report stating, "There is conclusive evidence that:  Completely substituting electronic nicotine and non-nicotine delivery systems for combustible tobacco cigarettes reduces users’ exposure to numerous toxicants and carcinogens present in combustible tobacco cigarettes.”

France
In 2019, the Académie Nationale de Médecine (French National Academy of Medicine) issued this public statement (translated to English):  “It is established that the vaporette is less dangerous than the cigarette… It is therefore preferable for a smoker to vape.  Since 2016, the High Authority for Health (HAS) considers it ‘as an aid to stop or reduce the consumption of tobacco by smokers.’ Santé Publique France indicates that at least 700,000 [French] smokers have quit using electronic cigarettes. ...Smokers who were about to switch to vaporizing instead of tobacco should not hesitate…”  But in 2022, French health body le Haut Conseil de la santé publique (HCSP) changed its advice, and now says health professionals should not recommend e-cigarettes for quitting, as there is not enough information on risks and benefits.

Germany
The German Cancer Research Center in Germany released a report in 2013 stating that e-cigarettes cannot be considered safe, in part due to technical flaws that have been found as well as unreliable information about product quality, including information provided by manufacturers. This report concluded the fluids and aerosols in e-cigarettes can contain dangerous substances and can cause short term airway irritation and may be harmful in long term use, and the effects on second hand exposure causing harm cannot be ruled out. The report also concluded that the e-cigarettes, whether it contains nicotine or not, can alleviate cravings and withdrawal symptoms, but their ability to help quit smoking has not been proven.

Spain
The Spanish Society of Pneumonology and Thoracic Surgery (SEPAR) released a position statement which states that the substances found in aerosol from e-cigarettes have not been demonstrated to be safe, and a number of chemicals which are carcinogens and can damage the lung have been found, though usually in concentrations smaller than conventional cigarettes. Studies done to date have been small in size and have had significant methodological flaws, making drawing any definitive conclusions about their ability to aid in smoking cessation impossible. The report concluded that "indiscriminate use" of e-cigarettes is a public health risk and they may encourage young people to start smoking, and therefore advocate regulation of e-cigarettes as a medicine and encourage smoking cessation through other more established means.

United Kingdom
A 2018 Public Health England report reiterated the approximation that e-cigarettes are 95% less harmful than smoking. In a 2015 joint statement, Public Health England and twelve other UK medical bodies concluded "e-cigarettes are significantly less harmful than smoking." A 2015 Public Health England report stated that e-cigarettes are estimated to be 95% less harmful than smoking. In a policy statement released with the report, Public Health England said that "PHE looks forward to the arrival on the market of a choice of medicinally regulated products that can be made available to smokers by the NHS on prescription." The studies used to support the 95% estimate were viewed as having a weak methodology. Many vigorously criticized the validity of the estimate that vaping is 95% less harmful than smoking. It was also criticized by the journal The Lancet for constructing its conclusions on 'flimsy' evidence, which included citing literature with apparent conflicts of interest. It was later discovered that many of the authors who came up with the "95% safer" assertion have ties to the tobacco industry. Some consider that the PHE report's specific number is flawed and confusing, by making opinions at odds with existing knowledge. Despite this, most other health organizations have been more cautious in their public statements on the safety of e-cigarettes. For example, the FDA reported that the potential health risks of using e-cigarettes are unclear.

In 2015 the English National Health Service advice page on smoking said "E-cigarettes are not risk free, but on current evidence they carry a fraction of the risk of smoked tobacco. As well as nicotine, e-cigarette liquid and vapour can contain toxic substances, although these are either at lower levels than seen in cigarette smoke or at levels not associated with health risk. The current best estimate is that e-cigarette use carries only around 5% of the risk of smoking. E-cigarettes are still fairly new and we won’t have a full picture on their safety until they have been in use for many years, so it will be important to continue to monitor the evidence as it develops." The UK National Health Service concluded in November 2014, "While e-cigarettes may be safer than conventional cigarettes, we don’t yet know the long-term effects of vaping on the body. There are clinical trials in progress to test the quality, safety and effectiveness of e-cigarettes, but until these are complete, the government can’t give any advice on them or recommend their use." In December 2015, the BBC reported that five Scottish NHS boards were considering reviewing their ban on e-cigarette use on hospital grounds, after 'new evidence showed they can help smokers quit'.

In 2014 the UK's National Centre for Smoking Cessation and Training, which provides training and accreditation to NHS "stop smoking practitioners", issued a new guideline downplaying concerns and stating that smoking cessation professionals should support e-cigarette users, though they remain unable to prescribe e-cigarettes.

A 2015 policy statement by the UK's Faculty of Public Health recognizes that there are potential benefits from the use of e-cigarettes but raises concerns that their effectiveness is not yet proven, that e-cigarettes are less effective than nicotine replacement therapy, concerns regarding dual usage of e-cigarettes and tobacco, concerns regarding advertising and young people and finally concerns regarding e-cigarettes undermining "decades of lobbying by public health related organisations" that led to the "smoking ban and tobacco control legislation".

The British Medical Association (BMA) stated in 2016 for e-cigarettes to be banned in public places such as bars, cafes, restaurants, museums and schools over concern for second-hand vapor. The BMA reported in 2013 that there was a possibility for smoking cessation benefits, but had concerns that e-cigarettes are less regulated than nicotine replacement therapy (NRT), and that there was no peer reviewed evidence concerning their safety or efficacy.

In May 2014, Cancer Research UK released a statement including, "Electronic cigarettes (e-cigarettes) are almost certainly much safer than tobacco cigarettes and may help smokers to cut down or quit smoking. We support the use of high quality e-cigarettes because we believe that they have significant potential to help smokers who aren't otherwise ready or able to quit smoking by providing them with much safer alternatives to smoked tobacco. It is important that regulation does not stifle the development of this market nor make accessing these products by smokers more difficult. However, the current safeguards are insufficient to ensure that these products are as safe as nicotine replacement therapy and to ensure that they are not marketed to non-smokers and children."

A National Institute for Health and Care Excellence (NICE) guideline in 2013 recommended licensed nicotine replacement therapy as part of a program for harm reduction, but did not recommend e-cigarettes as they are unregulated.

The Royal College of General Practitioners (RCGP) stated in 2016 that "although the long-term safety profile of EC use is still to be evaluated, it is accepted that vaping is an order of magnitude safer than conventional tobacco." The RCGP recommended, among other things, that "Where a patient wants to quit smoking, and has not succeeded with other options, GPs [general practitioners] should recommend and support the use of ENDS." In April 2016, the RCGP issued a report that concluded: "e-cigarettes appear to be effective when used by smokers as an aid to quitting smoking", that "the hazard to health arising from long-term vapour inhalation from the e-cigarettes available today is unlikely to exceed 5% of the harm from smoking tobacco", and that "the available evidence to date indicates that e-cigarettes are being used almost exclusively as safer alternatives to smoked tobacco, by confirmed smokers who are trying to reduce harm to themselves or others from smoking, or to quit smoking completely". The RCP report stated that: "in the interests of public health it is important to promote the use of e-cigarettes, NRT and other non-tobacco nicotine products as widely as possible as a substitute for smoking in the UK".

Two hospitals run by Sandwell and West Birmingham Hospitals NHS Trust opened vape shops in 2019 in conjunction with a ban on smoking. Public Health England now advises hospitals to let patients vape indoors - and even in bed.  The director of the UK Vaping Industry Association said “Prohibitive policies that treat vaping in the same way as smoking simply continue to expose people to tobacco harm and run the risk of missing out on the massive public health prize represented by vaping.”

United States

Government agencies 

Following five confirmed deaths in the US, on September 6, 2019, the Centers for Disease Control and Prevention stated that while this investigation is ongoing, people should consider not using e-cigarette products. In 2016, the US Food and Drug Administration (FDA) stated that "Although ENDS [electronic nicotine delivery systems] may potentially provide cessation benefits to individual smokers, no ENDS have been approved as effective cessation aids." They also stated that "Although ENDS likely do not deliver the same level of toxicants as cigarettes, studies show that there are dangers associated with ENDS use". In 2014, the FDA concluded, "E-cigarettes have not been fully studied, so consumers currently don’t know: the potential risks of e-cigarettes when used as intended, how much nicotine or other potentially harmful chemicals are being inhaled during use, or whether there are any benefits associated with using these products. Additionally, it is not known whether e-cigarettes may lead young people to try other tobacco products, including conventional cigarettes, which are known to cause disease and lead to premature death."

In 2015, the United States Preventive Services Task Force concluded there is insufficient evidence to recommend e-cigarettes for smoking cessation, and recommended clinicians instead recommend more proven smoking cessation aids.

In early 2015, Smokefree.gov, a website run by the Tobacco Control Research Branch of the National Cancer Institute to provide information to help quit smoking, did not recommend the use of e-cigarettes, saying "The bottom line is that we just don’t know enough about e-cigs, so we don’t recommend that you use them".

In late 2016, the National Institute for Occupational Safety and Health (NIOSH) states that users of e-cigarettes are exposed to many different types of chemical compounds, very small particles, and hazardous metals. Chemicals emitted in e-cigarette aerosols can include carcinogens such as formaldehyde, polyaromatic hydrocarbons, as well as various organic compounds that are irritating to the lung. Among flavoring compounds emitted in some e-cigarette aerosols are 2,3-pentanedione and diacetyl, which NIOSH has linked to causing obliterative bronchiolitis, a devastating lung disease in workers. Additionally there is also a risk of burns following spontaneous combustion of the lithium battery in the device.

Medical societies 
In 2010, the American Medical Association called for e-cigarettes to be subject to the same FDA regulations as tobacco and nicotine products. The Association extended this policy in 2014, and endorsed measures aimed at preventing marketing of e-cigarettes to minors.

In August 2014, the American Heart Association released a policy statement in which they noted that "current evidence evaluating the efficacy of these products as a cessation aid is sparse, confined to 2 randomized controlled trials and 1 large cross-sectional study, anecdotal reports, and Internet-based surveys." The statement stated "there is not yet enough evidence for clinicians to counsel their patients who are using combustible tobacco products to use e-cigarettes as a primary cessation aid." It also noted that "E-cigarettes either do not contain or have lower levels of several tobacco-derived harmful and potentially harmful constituents compared with cigarettes and smokeless tobacco. In comparison with NRTs, e-cigarette use has increased at an unprecedented rate, which presents an opportunity for harm reduction if smokers use them as substitutes for cigarettes. However, although firm evidence is lacking, there are concerns that e-cigarette use and acceptance of e-cigarettes has the potential to renormalize smoking behavior, sustain dual use, and initiate or maintain nicotine addiction. Their use also could serve as a gateway to reinitiation of smoking by ex-smokers. Unregulated e-cigarette use also has the potential to erode gains in smoking cessation and smoke-free laws."

Another statement released that month by the American Lung Association argued that the FDA should begin its regulatory oversight of electronic cigarettes, because otherwise, "there is no way for the public health, medical community or consumers to know what chemicals are contained in e-cigarettes or what the short and long term health implications might be."

The American Cancer Society supports every smoker using any way they choose who are contemplating trying to quit smoking and in 2018 they stated to use FDA regulated medicine that have a track record of effectively helping efforts to stop smoking. For some smokers who do not try to quit smoking cigarettes using FDA regulated medicine they recommend to choose the least unsafe tobacco product and they stated transitioning to only using e-cigarettes is better than smoking combustible ones. The American Cancer Society concluded in early 2014, "Because the American Cancer Society doesn’t yet know whether e-cigarettes are safe and effective, we cannot recommend them to help people quit smoking. There are proven methods available to help people quit, including pure forms of inhalable nicotine as well as nasal sprays, gums, and patches."

The American Diabetes Association states "e-cigarettes are not supported as an alternative to smoking or to facilitate smoking cessation."

In 2015, the American Association for Cancer Research and the American Society of Clinical Oncology released a statement noting that further research was needed regarding the regulation of electronic cigarettes. The statement also called on the FDA Center for Tobacco Products to regulate all e-cigarettes that meet the definition of tobacco products.

In October 2015, the American Academy of Pediatrics (AAP) recommends against e-cigarettes for quitting smoking and stated among adolescents, e-cigarette use is related with reduced quitting smoking. They also support increasing the legal age for sale of tobacco products including e-cigarettes to 21, since, according to the AAP, "80% of smokers began smoking prior to age 18 while adolescence is a period in which people are particularly susceptible to the addictive nature of nicotine." In 2015, the American College of Physicians policy position statement recommendations included banning flavoring, taxation of tobacco products to encompass e-cigarettes, and regulations of emission standards associated with e-cigarettes.

On September 9, 2019, following an upsurge of reports of lung disease associated with vaping, the American Medical Association issued a statement saying "In light of increasing reports of e-cigarette-associated lung illnesses across the country, the AMA urges the public to avoid the use of e-cigarette products until health officials further investigate and understand the cause of these illnesses." The next day the American Lung Association issued a warning, saying "E-cigarettes are not safe and can cause irreversible lung damage and lung disease. No one should use e-cigarettes or any other tobacco product. This message is even more urgent today following the increasing reports of vaping-related illnesses and deaths nationwide." On November 19, 2019, the American Medical Association urged for a complete ban on all types of vaping products that are not approved by the US FDA as quitting smoking aids.

State and local agencies 
The US National Association of County and City Health Officials stated in 2012, "Currently, little scientific evidence exists to show that e-cigarettes are effective cessation devices" and "Further research is needed on the health risks of e-cigarettes, but available evidence suggests harmful effects. They recommend to local health departments to advocate for regulation as a tobacco product to the extent allowable by law.

In 2015 the California Department of Public Health issued a report that found e-cigarettes expose users and bystanders to harmful chemicals, there is no scientific evidence they help smokers quit, they are being heavily marketed, and teen use is growing rapidly.

References

Electronic cigarettes